The Buffalo Chronicle is a fake news website. It has run fake stories concerning one or more Canadian politicians, and has paid to have its content about them run on Facebook. It was founded in the United States in 2014.

Content 
Prior to the 2019 Canadian federal election, the Buffalo Chronicle claimed without evidence that Canadian prime minister Justin Trudeau was looking to suppress a supposed sex scandal involving a student at the West Point Grey Academy, where Trudeau taught at between 1998 and 2001, and that they had seen a "password-protected" non-disclosure agreement sent by the supposed student's father. The latter claim was cited in January 2022 by InfoWars host Owen Shroyer, who claimed that Trudeau had signed a million-dollar non-disclosure agreement with a minor who had allegedly accused him of sexual misconduct.

In November 2020, the website promoted false claims that a mafia boss was paid $3 million to forge 300,000 votes for Joe Biden in that year's presidential election.

In 2022, a satirical cannabis hoax Buffalo Chronicle story about Amtrak selling cannabis onboard U.S. trains, and allowing consumption in designated smoking cars, at the urging of Senate Majority Leader Chuck Schumer, a proponent of cannabis legalization, was reprinted in its entirety in Railway Age along with commentary. The story had Schumer saying the regulation "will improve the passenger experience and increase ticket sales".

Operation 
The website is operated by Matthew Ricchiazzi, who sought office in several New York state elections without success. A 2019 investigation by BuzzFeed News and the Toronto Star found that Ricchiazzi had previously offered to publish positive or negative coverage of political candidates for money.

In 2019, the website claimed to have "never been sued for defamation or any other matter" or received a cease and desist letter.

References

Further reading

American websites
2014 establishments in the United States

External links 

 

Fake news websites